Sandra Eilene Black (born 1969) is a Professor of Economics and International and Public Affairs at Columbia University.  She received her B.A. from UC Berkeley and her Ph.D. in economics from Harvard University.  Since that time, she worked as an economist at the Federal Reserve Bank of New York, and as an assistant, associate, and ultimately full professor in the Department of Economics at UCLA before arriving at the University of Texas at Austin in 2010. She is currently a research associate at the National Bureau of Economic Research (NBER), a research affiliate at IZA Institute of Labor Economics, and a nonresident senior fellow at Brookings Institution.  She served as a Member of Barack Obama’s Council of Economic Advisers from August 2015 to January 2017.

Research

Her research focuses on the role of early life experiences on the long-run outcomes of children, as well as issues of gender and discrimination.

Selected works
 Black, Sandra E., and Lisa M. Lynch. "How to compete: the impact of workplace practices and information technology on productivity." Review of Economics and statistics 83, no. 3 (2001): 434-445.
 Black, Sandra E. "Do better schools matter? Parental valuation of elementary education." The Quarterly Journal of Economics 114, no. 2 (1999): 577-599.
 Black, Sandra E., and Lisa M. Lynch. "Human-capital investments and productivity." The American economic review 86, no. 2 (1996): 263-267.
 Black, Sandra E., Paul J. Devereux, and Kjell G. Salvanes. "The more the merrier? The effect of family size and birth order on children's education." The Quarterly Journal of Economics 120, no. 2 (2005): 669-700.
 Black, Sandra E., Paul J. Devereux, and Kjell G. Salvanes. "From the cradle to the labor market? The effect of birth weight on adult outcomes." The Quarterly Journal of Economics 122, no. 1 (2007): 409-439.

References

External links 
 Personal website

1969 births
21st-century American economists
American women economists
Education economists
Harvard Graduate School of Arts and Sciences alumni
Labor economists
Living people
University of California, Berkeley alumni
University of California, Los Angeles faculty
United States Council of Economic Advisers
University of Texas at Austin faculty
American women non-fiction writers
21st-century American women
Brookings Institution people
Columbia University faculty